It's OK to Listen to the Gray Voice is an album by the Norwegian saxophonist Jan Garbarek released on the ECM label and performed by Garbarek, David Torn, Eberhard Weber and Michael Di Pasqua.

Track listing 
All compositions by Jan Garbarek.

 "White Noise of Forgetfulness – 8:22
 "The Crossing Place" – 9:10
 "One Day in March I Go Down to the Sea and Listen" – 5:32
 "Mission: To Be Where I Am" – 8:08
 "It's OK to Phone the Island That Is a Mirage" – 5:49
 "It's OK to Listen to the Gray Voice" – 4:41
 "I'm the Knife-Thrower's Partner" – 0:54

Personnel 
 Jan Garbarek – tenor saxophone, soprano saxophone
 David Torn – guitar, guitar synthesizer, DX7
 Eberhard Weber – bass
 Michael Di Pasqua – drums, percussion

References 

Jan Garbarek albums
1985 albums
ECM Records albums
Albums produced by Manfred Eicher